Montgomery Court, at 215 E. Eleventh Ave. in the Capitol Hill neighborhood of Denver, Colorado, was built in 1908.  It was listed on the National Register of Historic Places in 1986.

It is a 45-unit brick apartment building, built in a modified Renaissance Revival style.  It was built by contractors Alexander Mathers and Cecil Walker.

References

National Register of Historic Places in Denver
Renaissance Revival architecture in Colorado
Buildings and structures completed in 1908